Ehrlichia muris is a species of pathogenic bacteria first isolated from mice, with type strain AS145T. Its genome has been sequenced.

References

Further reading

External links
LPSN

WISC entry
CDC Ehrlichiosis entry
Type strain of Ehrlichia muris at BacDive -  the Bacterial Diversity Metadatabase

Rickettsiales